Dr Eugen Molodysky OAM, MMBS is an academic and medical practitioner in preventive medicine and translational research. His research has been published in peer reviewed journals over the last 30 years. He has a life-long professional focus on prevention, preclinical diagnosis and early intervention.

His expertise in early detection and diagnosis has been important in Australian medical practice. His work has contributed to the availability of HPV screening for cervical cancer, coronary plaque detection as an early predicator of silent heart disease, and CTC screening for pre-clinical cancer detection.

Molodysky is currently a Clinical Associate Professor at the Sydney Medical School, Faculty of Medicine and Health, The University of Sydney. He is also a Specialist in General Practice at St Vincent's Private Hospital. He was the first Visiting Medical Officer (VMO) appointed to this role in 1987.

His clinical work has contributed to the early identification of HIV/AIDS in the 1980s epidemic in Australia. Alongside his existing obstetric practice, Molodysky established Australia's first AIDS (HIV) Clinic, the Eastside Medical Centre in Paddington, NSW, focused on the male homosexual/gay community.

He is known for his contribution to research and policy and has been a respected advocate and contributor to preventive medicine across a variety of fields including sexual health, disease prevention and longevity.

Early life and education 
Eugen Molodysky was born in Richmond, NSW, Australia.

He was educated at Oatley West Public School, and later at Sydney Technical High School, Sydney.

In 1970, Molodysky began his medical education at The University of Sydney but adjourned his formal studies for a year when presented with an opportunity to study nutrition, exercise, meditation and acupuncture as an integral part of medical care. He attained a Diploma of Acupuncture from the Hong Kong College of Acupuncture.

In 1977, Molodysky would complete his medical degree obtaining a MBBS (now MD) from The University of Sydney and in 1980 received a postgraduate Diploma of Obstetrics from the Royal Australian and New Zealand College of Obstetricians and Gynaecologists (RANZCOG). Molodysky would continue his work in the field of obstetrics for the next two decades.

Dr Molodysky was awarded his PhD from The University of Sydney with original research into HPV testing as a screening tool for cervical cancer.

Honours 
Molodysky was awarded the Medal of the Order of Australia (OAM) in 2008 for service to medical education, through clinical teaching, curriculum and professional development and research into cervical cancer prevention.

In 2015, he was awarded the ACNEM Braham Rabinov Award.

Notable medical achievements 

Dr Molodysky has encouraged more advanced screening methods to be used in mainstream medicine and has identified new methods for screening for cancers and other diseases, translating them into clinical practice.

HIV/AIDS

In 1983, Molodysky identified, diagnosed, and referred Australia's first AIDS (HIV) patient in the Australian primary care setting to Professor Ron Penny at St Vincent's Hospital, Sydney following a negative result with the T-Cell Mediated Immunity (CMI) test. This was before HIV was recognised as the cause of AIDS. He subsequently established the first primary care HIV clinic in Paddington. In the same year, he also established with Dr Thiru Underwood the first primary care Methadone Maintenance Clinic (MMC) in Summer Hill.

HPV screening – cervical cancer risk assessment

In the 1990s, Molodysky pursued his laboratory-based research, under Professor Brian Morris and the clinical application under Professor Charles Bridges-Webb both at the University of Sydney, culminating in his PhD (2000). His PhD thesis (2000), patent and publications which emphasised the screening and early detection of cervical cancer through HPV, contributed to the introduction of routine HPV screening into the Australian primary care setting in 2017.

In 1993, following research into cervical cancer, Molodysky introduced HPV testing as an adjunct to screening for abnormal cervical cells identified on microscopy, to the primary care setting as an early predictor of cervical cancer risk. It was not until September 2017, that HPV DNA (automated PCR) testing became the Australian national standard for the early detection of cervical cancer risk in women, and Australia is now on track to eliminate this cancer as a public health problem by 2028.

Heart disease risk assessment

Following briefing at the St Francis Hospital, New York with Dr. Alan D. Guerchi, in 2003 Molodysky introduced Coronary Artery Calcium Score (CACS) testing into the Australian primary care setting as a predictor of coronary artery disease risk. By 2020, the Heart Foundation of Australia added CACS testing to estimate the risk of having a heart attack or stroke.

Diabetes risk assessment

Since 2008, Molodysky has been testing and evaluating blood Insulin levels in primary care patients, as an early predictor of type-2 diabetes risk.

COVID-19

In 2020, Molodysky developed and introduced the COVID-Safe Workplace Policy for the Fink Group across all its restaurants.

Key roles and appointments  

In 1979, Molodysky was instrumental in establishing the N.S.W. College of Osteopathic and Natural Therapies and the Osteopathic Board of NSW (now known as the Osteopathic Council of NSW) which resulted in the formal recognition and registration of osteopathy as a discipline.

Since 1982, Molodysky has served in a number of key roles, including as the Chair of the Medical Education Committee of the NSW Faculty of the Royal Australian College of General Practitioners (RACGP), the Chair of the Eastern Sydney Division of General Practice (ESDGP) (the forerunner of the Central and Eastern Sydney Primary Health Network), the Foundation Chair of GP Synergy (previously SIGPET - Sydney Institute of General Practice Education and Training) and as the President of the Australasian College of Nutritional & Environmental Medicine (ACNEM).

In 1989, as Chair of the NSW Continuing Medical Education Committee (CMEC), and as a member of the Medical Education Committee of Council (MECC) of the RAGCP, introduced ongoing medical education (QI & CPD) for primary care doctors which would eventually become mandatory for continual medical registration throughout Australia with AHPRA.

In 2005, in recognition of his standing both in the community and the medical profession, Molodysky was invited by the Community Relations Commissioner of NSW to be its nominee on the NSW Medical Board (now Medical Council of NSW).

In 2006, he was appointed as a member of the NSW Medical Board by the Governor of NSW and remained a member until 2009, at which time the Australian Health Practitioner Registration Agency (AHPRA) was introduced to supersede the NSW Medical Board.

In 2007, he was appointed as the Head of Asia-Pacific Economic Cooperation (APEC) Medical Team by the Office of the Prime Minister of Australia.

Clinical curriculum development and teaching 
In 1987, Molodysky was appointed by Professor Charles Bridges-Webb as the medical ethics lecturer with the Discipline of General Practice at The University of Sydney, and from 1987 to 1996, he assisted in the development of problem-based learning (PBL) which in 1997 became a teaching cornerstone of the new graduate medical program (GMP) at Sydney Medical School at The University of Sydney.

In 1989, in collaboration with the RACGP, Molodysky developed and produced Medicine Today, the first video education series for Australian primary care doctors co-hosted by Professor Kerryn Phelps and Dr Derek Richardson. This video education series was endorsed and launched by the Australian Minister for Health, Dr Neil Blewett.

Later that year as chair, Continuing Medical Education Committee of the NSW RACGP Faculty (CMEC), and member of The Medical Education Committee of Council (MECC), RACGP, introduced Continuing Professional Development (CPD) for Australian primary care doctors. Participation in the RACGP QI & CPD Program subsequently became mandatory for continued medical registration in Australia.

In 2003, Molodysky introduced the Clinical Teacher Training Program at the Central Clinical School at The University of Sydney Medical School, to provide formal teacher training to clinical academic teachers involved in teaching medical students. In 2006, as part of the Sydney Medical School Curriculum Review, Molodysky also recommended teacher training for undergraduate medical students. Today, the clinical teacher training is provided at all levels of education including undergraduate medical students, registrars and clinical teachers.

Molodysky also recommended, as part of the 2006 Curriculum Review, that research exposure and training should be part of all undergraduate medical training. The MD Research Project continues to this day as an integral component of The University of Sydney undergraduate medical curriculum.  

In 2006, Molodysky developed and introduced an evidence-based, team-based learning (TBL) program facilitated by primary care practitioners, for senior high school students (from 16 regional high schools), addressing adolescent health issues, known as the Youth Wellbeing Forums.

In 2016, Molodysky as President of ACNEM and Editor-in-Chief published the first edition of the nutritional medicine-based Primary Care Fellowship Curriculum which was endorsed and launched by the Australian Minister for Health, Ms. Sussan Ley. This seminal document established an international platform from which to formally launch the education and training of primary care physicians in the delivery of preventive medicine in day-to-day clinical practice.

References 

Living people
Australian general practitioners
Recipients of the Medal of the Order of Australia
Academic staff of the University of Sydney
Year of birth missing (living people)